The Ken Lockwood Gorge Bridge is a steel plate girder bridge built for the High Bridge Branch of the Central Railroad of New Jersey (CNJ) to cross the South Branch Raritan River in Ken Lockwood Gorge of Hunterdon County, New Jersey. It is now open for pedestrian traffic on the Columbia Trail, a rail trail that starts in High Bridge.

History
The first bridge constructed here was a wooden Howe truss bridge. On April 18, 1885, an iron ore train drawn by a Baldwin locomotive (#112), named Columbia, fell into the river when the center and southern spans collapsed. Temporary repairs were then made to the bridge.

In 1931, it was strengthened to carry heavier loads. The last passenger service on the railroad was in 1935 and the last freight service in 1976.

Gallery

See also
List of crossings of the Raritan River

References

External links
 

Lebanon Township, New Jersey
Bridges in Hunterdon County, New Jersey
Bridges completed in 1891
1891 establishments in New Jersey
Railroad bridges in New Jersey
Pedestrian bridges in New Jersey
Steel bridges in the United States
Plate girder bridges in the United States
Rail trail bridges in the United States
Bridges over the Raritan River